Bay Shore is a major railroad station on the Montauk Branch of the Long Island Rail Road (LIRR), on Park Avenue and Oak Street north of Suffolk CR 50 (Union Boulevard) and west of Fourth Avenue, in Bay Shore, New York. Ferries to Fire Island board from a port south of the station.

History
Bay Shore station was built by the South Side Railroad of Long Island (SSRRLI) on May 20, 1868 as Penataquit station only to be renamed Bay Shore station in July 1868. It was replaced in 1882 and replaced again on July 17, 1912, in the style typical of stations such as Riverhead, Manhasset, Northport, and Mineola. The station also had a freight yard nearby. 

High-level platforms were added in 1984. The entrance to the station once had decorative pillars on the sides, and a railroad hotel once existed behind the station plaza. It is one of the few stations on the LIRR with two station buildings. The larger building was for the westbound platform and the smaller one was for the eastbound platform. An underground pedestrian tunnel once connected the two station houses until a pedestrian bridge was built in 2009. Both station houses still stand, but the smaller one previously used for the eastbound platform was taken over by the MTA. The new overpass brought a renovation project, replacing platform lighting and adding new platform waiting shelters.

Station layout
The station has two high-level side platforms each 12 cars long. There are two large parking lots on each side of the tracks.

References

External links 

Old Bay Shore Station (Arrt's Arrchives)
Bay Shore Station History (Trains Are Fun.com)
Unofficial LIRR website
Westbound and Eastbound station houses (February 2000)
Second station house with underpass sign (May 2007)
Pedestrian underpass and odd clock (May 2007)

 Station from 4th Avenue from Google Maps Street View

Long Island Rail Road stations in Suffolk County, New York
Islip (town), New York
Railway stations in the United States opened in 1868